The members of the Parliament of Fiji from 1992 to 1994 consisted of members of the House of Representatives elected between 23 and 30 May 1992 and members of the appointed Senate.

House of Representatives

References

 1992